VultureHound is a British monthly magazine that is focused on popular culture, entertainment and professional wrestling. Founded in 2011 as an entertainment website, it launched its first magazine in 2014. Since its foundation, its current Editor-in-Chief is David Garlick.

History 
Vulture Hound was founded in 2011 and the first magazine came out on 1 March 2014. The publication currently has three paid full-time employees and has about 50 paid freelance journalists.

In addition to the website and magazine, Vulture Hound has two podcasts: Breaking Glass, a retrospective on the musical career of David Bowie and SteelChair Shoot, covering professional wrestling.

In 2016 the magazine was featured on the website for the 2016 film, Till We Meet Again for its review of the film.

References

External links 
 

2011 establishments in the United Kingdom
Music magazines published in the United Kingdom
Monthly magazines published in the United Kingdom
Magazines established in 2014
Magazines published in London
Professional wrestling magazines